The sixty-fifth Connecticut House of Representatives district elects one member of the Connecticut House of Representatives. Its current representative is Democrat Michelle Cook, who defeated three-term incumbent Republican Anne Ruwet in 2008. The district consists of part of the city of Torrington. It is one of the most electorally volatile districts in the state, having changed hands between parties three times since 2000.

List of representatives

Recent elections

External links 
 Google Maps - Connecticut House Districts

References

65